Jønsson may refer to:
Finnur Jónsson, Danish philologist
Halfdan Jønsson, Danish trade unionist
Janni Jønsson, Danish cricketer
Jens Jønsson, Danish footballer
Karen Jønsson, Danish actress
Pernille Jønsson, Danish cricketer
Wili Jønsson, Danish musician

See also
Ári Jónsson, Faroese footballer
Bjarni Jónsson, Icelandic mathematician